Henry Bunis (born March 27, 1953) is a former professional tennis player from the United States.

Biography

Early years and education
Born in Cincinnati, he is one of three sons of Alvin and Ann Bunis.

Bunis, winner of the Ohio high school state championship in 1971, was a two-time All American varsity tennis player at the Columbia University in New York, while he completed an arts history major.

Professional tennis
Following graduation in 1975, Bunis turned professional and spent four years on tour. He made the quarter-finals at Cologne in 1976, to match his best performance in a Grand Prix tournament, a quarter-final appearance in Cincinnati while at Columbia University in 1974. At a tournament in Little Rock in 1977 he managed to win a set against Björn Borg, in front of a crowd of 3,500 in Arkansas.

Bunis also made appearances at the French Open, Wimbledon and the US Open. He had three wins at Grand Slam level, to make the second round twice at the US Open and at the 1977 Wimbledon Championships, where he won a marathon 72 game match against Raz Reid.

His only final on the Grand Prix tour came in the doubles, when he and partner Paul McNamee were runners-up at the 1977 Chilean Open, .

Later life
When he retired from tennis in 1978 he began working with JP Morgan in New York and later completed a J.D. degree at New York Law School in June 1992, after which he worked for 20 years with real state company Archstone.

Bunis now lives in Cincinnati, Ohio and is married with two sons, Evan and Ryan.

Grand Prix career finals

Doubles: 1 (0–1)

References

External links
 
 

1953 births
Living people
American male tennis players
Tennis players from Cincinnati
Columbia Lions men's tennis players
New York Law School alumni